The 2014 Singapore Super Series was the fifth super series tournament of the 2014 BWF Super Series. The tournament took place in Singapore from 08–13 April 2014 with a total purse of $300,000.

Men's singles

Seeds 

  Lee Chong Wei
  Kenichi Tago
  Tommy Sugiarto (withdrew)
  Boonsak Ponsana
  Du Pengyu
  Shon Wan-ho
  Nguyen Tien Minh
  Kento Momota

Top half

Bottom half

Finals

Women's singles

Seeds 

  Li Xuerui
  Wang Yihan
  Ratchanok Intanon
  Bae Yeon-ju
  Sung Ji-hyun
  Tai Tzu-ying
  Saina Nehwal
  Pusarla Venkata Sindhu

Top half

Bottom half

Finals

Men's doubles

Seeds 

  Muhammad Ahsan / Hendra Setiawan
  Hiroyuki Endo / Kenichi Hayakawa
  Angga Pratama / Ryan Agung Saputra
  Hoon Thien How / Tan Wee Kiong
  Kim Sa-rang / Yoo Yeon-seong
  Lee Sheng-mu / Tsai Chia-hsin
  Gideon Markus Fernaldi / Markis Kido
  Takeshi Kamura / Keigo Sonoda

Top half

Bottom half

Finals

Women's doubles

Seeds 

  Christinna Pedersen / Kamilla Rytter Juhl
  Bao Yixin / Tang Jinhua
  Misaki Matsutomo / Ayaka Takahashi
  Jang Ye-na / Kim So-young
  Ma Jin / Wang Xiaoli
  Pia Zebadiah Bernadeth / Rizki Amelia Pradipta
  Reika Kakiiwa / Miyuki Maeda
  Nitya Krishinda Maheswari / Greysia Polii

Top half

Bottom half

Finals

Mixed doubles

Seeds 

  Tantowi Ahmad / Lilyana Natsir
  Xu Chen / Ma Jin
  Ko Sung-hyun / Kim Ha-na
  Chan Peng Soon / Goh Liu Ying
  Sudket Prapakamol / Saralee Thoungthongkam
  Markis Kido / Pia Zebadiah Bernadeth
  Lee Chun Hei / Chau Hoi Wah
  Riky Widianto / Puspita Richi Dili

Top half

Bottom half

Finals

References 

Singapore
Singapore Open (badminton)
Super Series
Singapore Super Series